Cerrato is a surname. Notable people with the surname include:

Elda Cerrato (born 1930), Argentine artist, and Professor at the Universidad de Buenos Aires
Rodrigo de Cerrato (1259–1276), Castilian historian and hagiographer
Vinny Cerrato, the former Executive Vice President for Football Operations for the Washington Redskins of the National Football League